The Lady of the Camellias (Italian: La signora dalle camelie) is a 1947 Italian musical drama film directed by Nelly Corradi, Gino Mattera and Manfredi Polverosi. It is an adaptation of the 1853 opera La traviata by Giuseppe Verdi. In 1948 it was released in America by Columbia Pictures under the title The Lost One.

The film's sets were designed by the art director Gastone Medin. Costume design was by Georges Annenkov.

Cast
Nelly Corradi as Violetta Valery 
Gino Mattera as Alfredo Germont 
Manfredi Polverosi as Georg Germont 
Flora Marino as Flora Bervoix 
Carlo Lombardi as Baron Douphol 
Massimo Serato as Alexandre Dumas fils (prologue) 
Nerio Bernardi as Giuseppe Verdi (prologue) 
Onelia Fineschi as Singer: opera 
Tito Gobbi as Singer: opera 
Francesco Albanese as Singer: opera 
Arturo la Porta as Singer: opera

References

Bibliography

External links

1947 drama films
Italian drama films
Films directed by Carmine Gallone
Films based on operas
Italian black-and-white films
Opera films
1940s Italian films